Austen Fenwick Campbell (5 May 1901 – 8 September 1981) was an England international footballer who played eight games for his country between 1928 and 1931. He won an F.A. Cup Final Winners Medal with Blackburn Rovers in 1928. The game was against Huddersfield Town who Campbell went on to play for after he left Rovers.

References

External links

Profile on englandfootballonline

1901 births
1981 deaths
Footballers from County Durham
English footballers
England international footballers
Association football defenders
Huddersfield Town A.F.C. players
Blackburn Rovers F.C. players
English Football League players
English Football League representative players
FA Cup Final players